Hugh Persevall, Rector of Cork and Prebendary of Timoleague, was the Dean of Ross, Ireland  from 1615 until his death in 1630.

References

Deans of Ross, Ireland
1630 deaths